The 1981 Summer Universiade, also known as the XI Summer Universiade, took place in Bucharest, Romania. The events were watched by 200,000 spectators.

Sports

Medal table

External links
 Universiada 81-TVR

 
1981
U
U
Summer Universiade, 1981
Multi-sport events in Romania
Sports competitions in Bucharest
1980s in Bucharest
Summer Universiade